Sona Ghazarian (born September 2, 1945) is an Armenian-Austrian operatic soprano. A Kammersängerin of the Republic of Austria, she has sung over 70 roles in the major opera houses of both Europe and the United States.

Biography
Sona Ghazarian was born in Beirut in 1945, where she studied psychology at the American University of Beirut and singing at the National Conservatory. After further study at the Accademia Musicale Chigiana in Siena and the Accademia di Santa Cecilia in Rome, she joined the Vienna State Opera in 1972 and sang there for many years where her roles have included Oscar in Un ballo in maschera and Violetta in La Traviata. She made her Salzburg Festival debut in 1973 as Barbarina in Le nozze di Figaro and subsequently sang there in 1975 as Blonde in Die Entführung aus dem Serail and in 1983 as Marzelline in Fidelio. Her Metropolitan Opera debut came in 1987 as Adina in L'elisir d'amore. She returned there in 1989 as Musetta in La bohème.

Selected recordings

 Beethoven: Fidelio (Theo Adam, Hildegard Behrens, Sona Ghazarian, Peter Hofmann, Gwynne Howell et al.; Chicago Symphony Orchestra; Sir Georg Solti, conductor). Label: Decca (CD)
 Bellini: I Capuleti e i Montecchi (Sona Ghazarian, Ottavio Garaventa, Agnes Baltsa, Tugomir Franc, Kurt Rydl; Vienna State Opera Orchestra and Chorus; Giuseppe Patané, conductor). Live recording 10 August 1977. Label: Gala (CD)
 Strauss: Arabella (Gundula Janowitz, Sona Ghazarian, René Kollo, Edita Gruberova, Bernd Weikl; Vienna Philharmonic Orchestra; Sir Georg Solti, conductor). Label: Decca (DVD)
 Verdi: Un ballo in maschera (Montserrat Caballé, José Carreras, Patricia Payne, Sona Ghazarian, Ingvar Wixell et al.; Royal Opera House Orchestra and Chorus; Colin Davis, conductor). Label: Decca (CD)

References

External links
 Chancellery of Crown Prince Alexander II of Yugoslavia, Their Royal Highnesses and the Foundation of H.R.H. Princess Katherine in association with the Austrian embassy, hosted a charity concert at the White Palace, 7 October 2004. Accessed 8 February 2009.
 Cummings, David, International Who's Who in Classical Music 2003, Routledge, 2003, p. 274. 
 Wiener MusikSeminar .
 Kennedy, Michael and Bourne, Joyce (eds) "Ghazarian, Sona" in The Concise Oxford Dictionary of Music, 1996. Accessed via subscription 8 February 2009.
 Metropolitan Opera Archives Ghazarian, Sona (Soprano). Accessed 8 February 2009.
 Salzburg Festival Archives Sona Ghazarian. Accessed 8 February 2009.

 Sona Ghazarian's Profile on onepoint.fm

1945 births
Living people
Armenian expatriates in Austria
Armenian operatic sopranos
Lebanese people of Armenian descent
Musicians from Beirut
Lebanese opera singers
Österreichischer Kammersänger
Austrian operatic sopranos
20th-century Armenian women opera singers